Jeremy Gruber is a lawyer, writer, and public policy advocate and is the senior vice president at Open Primaries.  He is the former President and Executive Director of the Council for Responsible Genetics. He has testified before the United States Congress  on genetic privacy and discrimination issues.  He was a leader of the successful effort to enact the Genetic Information Nondiscrimination Act as well as a number of state laws that preceded it and led the successful campaign to roll back a controversial student genetic testing program at the University of California, Berkeley. In 2011, Gruber led an effort to successfully enact CalGINA-a California law that extends genetic privacy and nondiscrimination protections into areas such as life, long term care, and disability insurance, mortgages, elections and other areas.

Gruber is a founder and executive committee member of the Coalition for Genetic Fairness and the Pew Project on the Genetic Information Nondiscrimination Act (GINA).  He is an author of the books Genetic Explanations: Sense and Nonsense published by Harvard University Press, Biotechnology in Our Lives published by Skyhorse Publishing, and The GMO Deception by Skyhorse Publishing. He is author of the reports The Myth of the Red State Policy Over Party in the Nebraska State Capitol and The Next Great Migration: The Rise of Independent Voters in America. He is also an author of the law review article Let All Voters Vote: Independents and the Expansion of Voting Rights in the United States.

Gruber received his Juris Doctor (J.D.) from St. John's University School of Law School of Law and a B.A. in Politics from Brandeis University. Previously, he worked as the field director for ACLU's National Taskforce on Civil Liberties in the Workplace and then as legal director for the National Workrights Institute.

References

External links
"Jeremy Gruber in NY Times
"Jeremy Gruber on CNN"
"Jeremy Gruber Forbes Profile"
"Jeremy Gruber on Workrights' Page"
"Speech at U.S. Equal Employment Opportunity Commission Meeting"
"Jeremy Gruber on CRG Page"
"Jeremy Gruber Brandeis Magazine Profile"
"Genetic Explanations Harvard Press Profile"

American nonprofit executives
American Civil Liberties Union people
Year of birth missing (living people)
Living people
St. John's University School of Law alumni
Brandeis University alumni